Fawad Naeem Rana is a Pakistani businessman who owns Lahore Qalandars, a cricket team based in Lahore, Pakistan and plays in Pakistan Super League.  He is also the managing director of Doha-based QALCO.

References 

Pakistani businesspeople
Pakistan Super League franchise owners
Pakistani expatriates in Qatar
Living people
University of Engineering and Technology, Lahore alumni
Year of birth missing (living people)